Frederick Denard Baxter (born June 14, 1971) is an American former college and professional football player who was a tight end in the National Football League (NFL) for eleven seasons.  He played for the NFL's New York Jets, Chicago Bears and New England Patriots. Baxter played college football for Auburn University and was selected by the Jets in the 5th round of the 1993 NFL Draft. He was born in Brundidge, Alabama.

References

1971 births
Living people
People from Brundidge, Alabama
Players of American football from Alabama
American football tight ends
Auburn Tigers football players
New York Jets players
Chicago Bears players
New England Patriots players